Bilbao Bizkaia Kutxa (BBK) (Basque for 'Bilbao Biscay Savings Bank') was a Spanish savings bank based in the province of Biscay in the Basque Country, Spain. Its full name was Bilbao Bizkaia Kutxa, Aurrezki Kutxa eta Bahitetxea (in Spanish Caja Bilbao Vizcaya, Caja de Ahorros y Monte de Piedad). It was formed in 1990 when the Caja de Ahorros Municipal de Bilbao and the Bizkaiko Aurrezki Kutxa-Caja de Ahorros Vizcaína were merged. The company headquarters were in Bilbao. On 1 January 2012 it merged with other Basque financial entities (a "loose merger"), Kutxa and Caja Vital Kutxa, to form Kutxabank.

BBK won a bid to take over CajaSur on 16 July 2010. The transaction created the 7th largest financial institution of Spain.

The savings bank had minority investments in the following companies: Iberdrola 6,84%, Euskaltel 33,99%, Enagas 5%, Red Eléctrica 2,2%.

References

External links

Official site

Basque companies
Defunct banks of Spain
Organisations based in Bilbao
1990 establishments in the Basque Country (autonomous community)
Banks established in 1990